Bukit station is a railway station located in Bukit Subdistrict, Cho-airong District, Narathiwat.

South Thailand insurgency events 
 On 17 July 2010, separatists shot two grenades at Bukit Railway Station, using an M79 grenade launcher. The shootings occurred at around 22:00, when all train services in the Hat Yai-Sungai Kolok area had been finished. No one was injured from the bombings. The first grenade crater was found about 5 metres to the right of the station building, and was 6 inches wide and 5 inches deep, with M79 shrapnel surrounding the area. The second grenade crater was found in a rambutan plantation next to a military patrol base in front of the station, which was 8 inches wide and 6 inches deep.
 On 28 August 2012, separatists shot Local Train No. 447 Surat Thani-Sungai Kolok between Bukit-Ai Satia, causing 1 fatality and 2 seriously injured. All casualties were military volunteers. The locomotive and all 6 bogies were all found to have bullet holes. The shootings occurred 2 times, the first about 500 metres from Bukit Station and the second at a military railway patrol base.

Services 
 Local No. 447/448 Surat Thani-Sungai Kolok-Surat Thani
 Local No. 451/452 Nakhon Si Thammarat-Sungai Kolok-Nakhon Si Thammarat
 Local No. 453/454 Yala-Sungai Kolok-Yala
 Local No. 463/464 Phatthalung-Sungai Kolok-Phatthalung

References 

 
 

Railway stations in Thailand